Parliamentary elections were held in Cuba on 24 February 1993 alongside elections to the fourteen Provincial Assemblies. Following the implementation of a new electoral law in 1992, voters now elected the National Assembly directly. Previously voters had elected members of the country's 169 municipal assemblies, who in turn had elected the National Assembly.

More than 60,000 people applied to be candidates, with the National Candidature Commission eventually selecting a list of 589 candidates. Voters could vote for the entire list or selected candidates. All 589 candidates received the 50% of votes required for election. 

Voter turnout was reported to be 99.57%.

Results

References

Cuba
Parliamentary elections in Cuba
1993 in Cuba
One-party elections
Single-candidate elections
February 1993 events in North America